USS Holmes County (LST-836) was an  built for the United States Navy during World War II. Named after counties in Florida, Mississippi, and Ohio, she was the only U.S. Naval vessel to bear the name.

Construction
Laid down as LST-836 by the American Bridge Company of Ambridge, Pennsylvania, on 11 September 1944; launched on 29 October; sponsored by Mrs. H. E. Hetu; and commissioned on 25 November.

Service in United States Navy

1940s
After shakedown off Florida, LST-836 loaded ammunition, lumber, and cement, then departed New Orleans, on 2 January 1945. She unloaded the cargo at Balboa, Panama, in the Canal Zone, and proceeded to San Diego, arriving on 23 January. In early February she sailed for Hawaii, where she trained, embarked troops, then steamed to the Marshall Islands. Following three weeks of preparation in the Marshalls and Carolines, the landing ship departed Ulithi, on 12 April, for Okinawa. With the battle for this strategic base well underway, LST-836 arrived six days later; unloaded troops and equipment and returned Ulithi, on 29 April.

For the rest of the war, she shuttled cargo and troops throughout the Pacific; then after VJ Day was assigned to duty with the occupation forces in Japan. Returning to the United States, LST-836 arrived San Francisco, on 19 January 1946; and remained on the West Coast until she decommissioned at Vancouver, Washington, on 25 July 1946.

1950s
Following four years in the Pacific Reserve Fleet, LST-836 recommissioned at Bremerton, Washington, on 3 November 1950. After refresher training she sailed for the Far East, to join United Nations forces in South Korea. Arriving at Yokosuka, on 28 March 1951, the veteran landing ship was once again assigned to a battle zone and for the next eight months shuttled cargo and troops between Japan and various Korean ports.

After a brief stateside overhaul in early 1952, LST-836 departed San Diego, on 24 July, for operations in conjunction with the first hydrogen bomb tests in the Marshall Islands. From August to November, she aided scientists as they tested this new source of power. She returned to San Diego; then, after a brief respite, sailed on 16 March 1953, for further duty in the still raging Korean War. Arriving at Yokosuka, on 22 April, LST-836 immediately commenced cargo runs from the staging areas to Inchon. When the fighting ended, LST-836 remained in the Far East to transport cargo to the United Nations peacekeeping force stationed in Korea.

From 1954 to 1959, she made three WestPac cruises and participated in training operations along the West Coast. On 1 July 1955, LST-836 was renamed Holmes County. Following a FRAM overhaul in late 1959, the landing ship was assigned to the Pacific Amphibious Force, and for the next five years Holmes County engaged in amphibious exercises along the West Coast and in the Hawaiian Islands.

1960s-1970s
On 11 October 1965, Holmes County left San Diego, for operations in Southeast Asia. She arrived at Da Nang, South Vietnam, on 22 November, and operated there for the rest of the year and into 1966. On 29 March 1966, after 89 days in the combat zone, Holmes County steamed for Yokosuka, for upkeep before starting the  journey home. Holmes County received the following message from Commander 7th Fleet: "As you depart 7th Fleet Intra-Coastal Task Unit, be assured you leave behind an admiration for the extraordinary work you have done this cruise." On 26 May, Holmes County arrived home. After serving in the San Diego area for four months, she participated in the Fleet Exercise "Operation Base Line" in October. This was one of the largest peacetime operations conducted by the Pacific Fleet.

Holmes County later returned to Vietnam, operating in that theatre until 1971.

Service in Republic of Singapore Navy

1970s-1980s 
Holmes County was transferred on loan to the Republic of Singapore Navy (RSN) on 1 July in 1971, being renamed as RSS Endurance (L201). The ship was eventually sold outright to Singapore on 5 December in 1975. Endurance, along with four other ex-US Navy LSTs sold to Singapore by the US at around the same period of time, served as part of the RSN's 191 Squadron of the 3rd Flotilla, with its main roles being transporting Singapore Army troops and personnel to training facilities abroad (in foreign countries such as Taiwan), rescue-and-aid operations, supply missions as well as for officer-cadet training programmes conducted overseas. Endurance was re-engined with MTU diesel-powered ship-engines during her service with the Singapore Navy.

1990s-2000s 
Following the commissioning of the new Endurance (LS207) into the Singapore Navy in 1999, she was decommissioned from active service for the last time in that same year, along with her sister ships, Excellence (L202; formerly LST-629), Intrepid (L203; formerly LST-579), Resolution (L204; formerly LST-649) and Persistence (L205; formerly LST-613). Currently, with the exception of Resolution, which is now moored at Tuas Naval Base for use as a training ship, all four ex-US Navy LSTs are employed as floating sea-defense barricades for Changi Naval Base.

Awards and honors 

 Combat Action Ribbon
 Navy Unit Commendation (2 awards)
 American Campaign Medal
 Asiatic-Pacific Campaign Medal (1 award)
 World War II Victory Medal
 Navy Occupation Service Medal with "Asia" clasp
 National Defense Service Medal (2 awards)
 Korean Service Medal (3 awards)
 Vietnam Service Medal (11 awards)
 Republic of Vietnam Gallantry Cross Unit Citation (5 awards)
 Republic of Vietnam Civil Actions Unit Citation
 United Nations Service Medal
 Republic of Vietnam Campaign Medal
 Republic of Korea War Service Medal (retroactive)

References

Bibliography

External links

 

LST-542-class tank landing ships
World War II amphibious warfare vessels of the United States
Cold War amphibious warfare vessels of the United States
Korean War amphibious warfare vessels of the United States
Vietnam War amphibious warfare vessels of the United States
1944 ships
Ships built in Ambridge, Pennsylvania
Holmes County, Florida
Holmes County, Mississippi
Holmes County, Ohio
Ships transferred from the United States Navy to the Republic of Singapore Navy
LST-542-class tank landing ships of the Republic of Singapore Navy